Agrarian Party of the Countryside,  or ASV is a political party in Slovakia.

In 2009, the party ran for the 2009 European Parliament elections with an electoral list headed by Peter Kopecký. Kopecký, vice president of the EUDemocrats had previously unsuccessfully tried to found his own party under the label of the Paneuropeist alliance Libertas.eu. ASV received 0.45% of the votes.

References

External links 
  Official site
  Entry in the official party registry

Agrarian parties
Political parties in Slovakia
Libertas.eu